Two Minute Warning is the seventh studio album by Australian band The Angels, released in January 1985. It was released in the US under their name Angel City. The album peaked at number 5 in Australia and it peaked at number 31 in New Zealand.

Track listing
Credits adapted from the original LP release.
Side one
"Small Price" (Richard Brewster, Brent Eccles, John Brewster) – 5:24    
"Look the Other Way" (R.Brewster, Doc Neeson, J. Brewster, Eccles) – 4:29   
"Underground" (R. Brewster, Neeson, J.Brewster) – 5:30   
"Front Page News" (R. Brewster, Eccles) – 3:32  
"Gonna Leave You" (R. Brewster, Neeson, J.Brewster) – 3:07

Side two 
"Between the Eyes" (R. Brewster, Eccles)  – 3:56  
"Babylon" (J. Brewster, Neeson, Eccles) – 5:18 
"Sticky Little Bitch" (R. Brewster, Neeson, J.Brewster) – 2:55
"Razor's Edge" (R.Brewster, Neeson, J. Brewster, Eccles) – 4:30 
"Run for the Shelter" (R. Brewster, Eccles)  – 3:37

Personnel
The Angels
Doc Neeson – lead vocals
Rick Brewster – lead guitar, backing vocals, producer on "Run for the Shelter"	 	 
John Brewster – rhythm guitar, backing vocals, producer on "Run for the Shelter", mixing
Jim Hilbun – bass guitar, backing vocals
Brent Eccles – drums

Additional musicians
Steve Forman – percussion

Production
Ashley Howe – producer, arranger, engineer, mixing on tracks 1 and 3
Lee De Carlo – engineer
Paul Wertheimer, Benny Saccone, Doug Schwartz – assistant engineers
Spencer Lee – engineer on "Run for the Shelter"
Jim Taig – mixing
Warren Dewey – mixing on tracks 1 and 3
Clark Germain – mixing assistant on tracks 1 and 3

Charts

References 

The Angels (Australian band) albums
1985 albums
Mushroom Records albums
Albums recorded at A&M Studios